California Correctional Institution (CCI) is a supermax state prison in the city of Tehachapi in southern California. CCI is sometimes referred to as "Tehachapi prison" or "Tehachapi". As stated by the California Department of Corrections and Rehabilitation, its overall mission is "to incarcerate and control felons, while providing the opportunity for meaningful work, training and other programs.  The prison provides programs for those inmates who are willing to work and participate fully in available programs."

Facilities
 
CCI is in the Cummings Valley region.

CCI has  including Level I ("Open dormitories with a secure perimeter") housing; Level II ("Open dormitories with secure perimeter fences and armed coverage") housing; Level III ("Individual cells, fenced perimeters and armed coverage") housing; Level IV ("Cells, fenced or walled perimeters, electronic security, more staff and armed officers both inside and outside the installation") housing; a Security Housing Unit (SHU, which is "the most secure area within a Level IV prison designed to provide maximum coverage"); and a Reception Center (RC) which "provides short term housing to process, classify and evaluate incoming inmates." As of November 2020, the facility's total population was 2983, or 107.2 percent of its design capacity of 2,783.

History
The original California Institution for Women, the first women's facility in California, opened on the site of what is now CCI in 1932. It was sometimes referred to as "Tehachapi", as in the 1940s films Maltese Falcon and Double Indemnity. The institution was "run for many years independently from the correctional system for men" but beginning in 1944 was gradually brought under the control of the California Department of Corrections. After the 1952 Kern County earthquake on July 21, "made the brick dormitories unsafe", the institution was closed and the 417 prisoners were sent to the new California Institution for Women in Corona.

The prison was reopened in 1954 as CCI, an all-men's prison. In 1985–1986, maximum and medium security facilities were added to it.  The Southern Maximum Security Complex at Tehachapi was "touted as the most advanced in the country", but was also "called a 'white elephant' and a 'Cadillac' because it took so long to build and cost so much".

Governor Arnold Schwarzenegger "directed inmate firefighters and staff from the California Department of Corrections and Rehabilitation", including those from CCI, to help fight the October 2007 California wildfires.

In popular culture
The women's prison has been frequently mentioned in popular film and radio, particularly during the noir era.
 The Maltese Falcon (1941)
 Double Indemnity (1944)
 Nocturne (1946) 
 The Postman Always Rings Twice (1946)
 Out of the Past (1947)
 The Hunted (1948)
 Criss Cross (1949)
 The Story of Molly X (1949)
 1001 Rabbit Tales (1982)
 The Black Echo, 1991
 Duckman episode title "Noir Gang" (1996)
 Inherent Vice by Thomas Pynchon (page 106 (Italian translation)) (2009)
 Dragnet'' radio drama series
 Wanda Jackson, "There's a Riot Goin' On" rock-a-billy recording

Notable inmates
 Inez Brown Burns (1886-1976), socialite convicted of performing illegal abortions; served 2 years and 7 months.
 Joseph Danks (born 1962), serial killer convicted of killing six women; was later transferred to San Quentin State Prison for killing a cellmate.
 Barbara Graham (1923-1955), murderer; later transferred to San Quentin State Prison and was executed.
 Philip Joseph Hughes Jr. (born 1948), serial killer
 John William Kelley (born 1963), serial killer and rapist.
 Blake Leibel (born 1981), former graphic novelist convicted of murdering his Ukrainian fiancé Iana Kasian in 2016
 Madge Meredith (1921-2017), actress wrongfully convicted of kidnapping; was released in 1951.
 Gerald Parker (born 1955), serial killer; sentenced prior to his killings for rape, robbery, and assault while admitted; was released in 1987.
 Robert Motley Murder and grand theft auto, 1988 escaped the Maximum Security yard Level 4A during the change of shift. He wore a correctional Officers uniform complete with Badge and walked out of the prison surrounded by guards.
 Kellen Winslow II, sex offender; On November 4, 2019, Winslow pleaded guilty to the rape of an unconscious teen and sexual battery on a 54-year-old hitchhiker as part of a plea deal. In exchange for his guilty plea at San Diego County Superior Court, the court agreed to sentence him to between 12 and 18 years in prison.

Notable staff
 David Scott Milton (1934-2020), author who ran a writer's workshop at the institution from 1991-2004

References

External links
 California Correctional Institution Official website
 California Department of Corrections and Rehabilitation Official website

1954 establishments in California
Prisons in California
Buildings and structures in Kern County, California